John Wilson (January 10, 1777 – August 9, 1848) was a U.S. Representative from Massachusetts.

Born in Peterborough, New Hampshire, Wilson graduated from Harvard University in 1799.
He studied law.
He was admitted to the bar in 1802 at Peterborough, New Hampshire, and commenced practice in Belfast in Massachusetts' District of Maine.
He served as a captain in the State militia.

Wilson was elected as a Federalist to the Thirteenth Congress (March 4, 1813 – March 3, 1815).
He was an unsuccessful candidate for reelection in 1814 to the Fourteenth Congress.
He resumed the practice of his profession in Belfast.
He was elected to the Fifteenth Congress (March 4, 1817 – March 3, 1819).
He was an unsuccessful candidate for renomination in 1818.
He engaged in the practice of law until his death in Belfast, Maine, August 9, 1848.
He was interred in Grove Cemetery.

Sources

1777 births
1848 deaths
Harvard University alumni
Maine lawyers
People from Belfast, Maine
People from Peterborough, New Hampshire
American militia officers
Federalist Party members of the United States House of Representatives from Massachusetts
19th-century American lawyers
Members of the United States House of Representatives from the District of Maine